Santoshi Matsa (born 10 March 1994) is an Indian weightlifter who won the silver medal in the women's 53 kg weight class at the 2014 Commonwealth Games at Glasgow. Matsa had originally finished in bronze medal position, but the gold medal winner Chika Amalaha of Nigeria failed a drug test, elevating Matsa to silver medal position. Santoshi lifted a total of 188 kg — 83 kg in snatch and 105 in clean and jerk.

Andhra Pradesh government announced cash reward of Rs five lakh for winning medal in weightlifting in the Commonwealth Games.

Major results

References

External links

List of Medal winners at Commonwealth Games Glasgow 2014 

Living people
Indian female weightlifters
1994 births
Weightlifters at the 2014 Commonwealth Games
Commonwealth Games silver medallists for India
Weightlifters at the 2010 Summer Youth Olympics
People from Vizianagaram district
Sportswomen from Andhra Pradesh
Commonwealth Games medallists in weightlifting
21st-century Indian women
20th-century Indian women
People from Uttarandhra
Medallists at the 2014 Commonwealth Games